The Arsenal Academy was a military academy in Columbia, South Carolina, originally established in 1842 as an independent school by the state of South Carolina.  In 1845, the academy became a component of the South Carolina Military Academy (now The Citadel), in which first year cadets underwent their initial year of training before completing their studies at the larger Citadel Academy in Charleston, South Carolina.  The school was burned by Sherman's forces in 1865 and never reopened.

History

At the outset of the Civil War in 1861, the South Carolina Military Academy consisted of two institutions, both built in the 1820s as state arsenals, specifically to have the state prepared in the event of a slave revolt like that planned by Denmark Vesey (who was from Charleston). This process consolidated a number of smaller arsenals around the state to two locations, which would in 1842 be converted to military academies. The Arsenal Academy, or Arsenal Military Academy, or The Arsenal, was in Columbia, and the Citadel Academy, or Citadel Military Academy, or The Citadel because of the appearance of its building, in Charleston. The Arsenal was burned by Union General William Sherman's troops in 1865; in fact, destroying it was one of his objectives. It was never rebuilt. The only surviving building from The Arsenal is the current Governor's Mansion.

The Citadel suffered no damage and, after serving as housing for Federal forces during the Reconstruction Era, reopened as the South Carolina Military Academy or commonly The Citadel Academy.

References

History of Columbia, South Carolina
Defunct United States military academies
Arsenals
Education in Richland County, South Carolina
Public universities and colleges in South Carolina
The Citadel, The Military College of South Carolina
American Civil War forts
1842 establishments in South Carolina
1865 disestablishments in South Carolina
Defunct universities and colleges in South Carolina